Abigail Pietersen (born 1 October 1984, in Cape Town) is a South African former competitive figure skater. She is the 2010 South African national champion and qualified to the free skate at three Four Continents Championships (2003, 2004, 2007). She switched to pair skating in 2005, but later switched back to singles. Her younger brother, Justin Pietersen, also competed internationally in figure skating.

Programs

Results

References

External links
 

South African female single skaters
1984 births
Living people
Sportspeople from Cape Town